Secret State is a 2012 British four-part political thriller, starring Gabriel Byrne, Charles Dance and Gina McKee, and inspired by Chris Mullin's 1982 novel A Very British Coup. It delves into the relationship between a democratically elected government, the military and big business. The first episode premiered on Channel 4 on 7 November 2012, with the other three parts being shown over the following three weeks.

Plot
In the run up to a general election, a devastating industrial accident on Teesside leaves 19 people dead and raises questions about the safety procedures of a US petrochemical company, PetroFex. The British prime minister claims to have secured a compensation package from them, but on his return from PetroFex HQ, his plane crashes in the Atlantic under mysterious circumstances. Deputy Prime Minister Tom Dawkins (Gabriel Byrne) takes command, and during his quest to find the truth and justice for the victims, he uncovers a conspiracy at the heart of the political system.

Main cast

 Gabriel Byrne as	Tom Dawkins MP, the Deputy Prime Minister who becomes Prime Minister of the United Kingdom after the death of his predecessor, Charles Flyte. 
 Charles Dance as John Hodder MP, the Chief Whip. 
 Stephen Dillane as Paul Jacob Clark, the CEO of PetroFex.
 Rupert Graves as Felix Durrell MP, the Home Secretary and later Chancellor of the Exchequer.
 Ralph Ineson as Sergeant Wrigglesworth, Dawkins' Diplomatic Protection Group bodyguard. 
 Russell Kilmister as Nillis Jacobson, a senior executive at PetroFex.
 Sylvestra Le Touzel as Ros Yelland MP, the Foreign Secretary 
 Anna Madeley as Gina Hayes, Dawkins' press officer.
 Gina McKee as Ellis Kane, a freelance journalist. 
 Ruth Negga as Agnes Evans, a GCHQ analyst. 
 Lia Williams as Laura Duchenne, the Director General of MI5. 
 Jamie Sives as Lee Foulds, Dawkins' personal secretary.
 Al Weaver as Joss Leyton a senior GCHQ analyst. 
 Douglas Hodge as Anthony Fossett, an investigative reporter and former MI6 officer.
 Nicholas Farrell as General Munnery, the Chief of Defence Staff. 
 Anton Lesser as Sir Michael Rix, the head of the Royal Caledonian Bank. 
 Tobias Menzies as Charles Flyte, the former prime minister who is killed at the start of the series. 

Chris Mullin, the author of A Very British Coup, which served as inspiration for Secret State, appears as a vicar in a cameo role.

Release
A DVD was released in the UK on 3 December 2012.

The series is available in the UK Amazon Instant Video and Channel 4 On Demand.

Other countries
All four episodes were shown on the German/French TV station Arte on 6 February 2014.

In Saudi Arabia the first one-hour part premiered on OSN (Orbit Showtime Network) on Friday 21 March 2014, with the other three parts being shown the following Fridays.

Series were shown in Croatia on HRT, from 14 April to 17 April 2014.

In Australia, the first episode aired on ABC on Friday 25 July 2014, with the other episodes over the subsequent three weeks, while in New Zealand it began its appearance on 10 August 2014 on TV One in the 10:30pm Sunday night slot.

See also 
 A Very British Coup (TV series), an adaption of A Very British Coup made in 1988
 List of fictional prime ministers of the United Kingdom

References

External links
 
 

2012 British television series debuts
2012 British television series endings
2010s British drama television series
2010s British political television series
Channel 4 television dramas
British political drama television series
2012 in British politics
Television series about prime ministers
Television series by All3Media
2010s British television miniseries
English-language television shows
Television shows set in the United Kingdom